Moe Kaung Kan Eain Met is a 2018 Burmese drama television series. It aired on MRTV-4, from July 13 to September 17, 2018, on Mondays to Fridays at 19:00 for 47 episodes.

Cast

Main
 Sithu Win as Ye Thway
 Kyaw Htet Zaw as Kar Yan Hein
 Poe Kyar Phyu Khin as Seng Mai
 Phone Sett Thwin as Jimmy
 Phyo Than Thar Cho as Gyan Pone
 Wai Yan Kyaw as Chit Htwe
 La Pyae as Ngwe Maung
 Hsu Sandi Yoon as Yamin
 Nay Yee Win as Sein Nu
 Htet Htet Moe Oo as Daw Mahuyar Khin
 Aye Myat Thu as Nay Chi Wint Htal
 Cho Pyone as A Phwar Pu

Supporting
 Nay Aung as U Nyein Chan Kyaw
 Aung Khaing as U Aung Htun
 Mike Mike as Naing Htun
 Lucas as Min Nay Yaung
 War War Aung as Daw Toot
 Khin Moht Moht Aye as Daw Ngwe Khin
 Aye Thidar as Daw Thein Tin
 A Yine as U Pauk Si
 Daung Wai as U Agga

References

Burmese television series
MRTV (TV network) original programming